Federico Leonardo Lucia (born 15 October 1989), known professionally as  Fedez, is an Italian rapper, singer, songwriter, social media personality and businessman. In 2011, he released the albums Penisola che non c'è and Il mio primo disco da venduto, released as free digital downloads. His first studio album, Sig. Brainwash – L'arte di accontentare, was released in 2013, and it debuted at number one on the Italian Albums Chart. The album, which spawned three singles, including the top 10 hit "Cigno nero" featuring Francesca Michielin, was later certified 3× Platinum by the Federation of the Italian Music Industry. As of December 2021, Fedez has 5 #1 studio albums, 25 top ten singles (11 of which peaked at #1) and 50 Platinum certifications.

Biography
Federico Leonardo Lucia was born in Milan on 15 October 1989. Before moving to Rozzano, he grew up between Buccinasco and Corsico, in the province of Milan.
He studied at the artistic lyceum, but he dropped out in his junior year.

Career
In 2011, Fedez recorded his first self-produced album with a budget of only €500, Penisola che non c'è. The album, released as a free digital download, was entirely composed of songs about political and social issues. 
Later in 2011, Fedez signed with the label Tanta Roba, founded by Guè Pequeno and DJ Harsh. The label produced his second free album, Il mio primo disco da venduto, released as a digital download in November of the same year.

In June 2012, Fedez appeared in a new version of 883's song "Jolly Blue", included on the album Hanno ucciso l'Uomo Ragno 2012, recorded by the band's frontman Max Pezzali to celebrate the twentieth anniversary since the release of their first full-length album, Hanno ucciso l'Uomo Ragno.

In January 2013, Fedez released his first single for a major label, "Si scrive schiavitù si legge libertà".
The song was later included in the album Sig. Brainwash - L'arte di accontentare, released by Sony Music on 5 March 2013. The album was also preceded by the top ten single "Cigno nero", performed with Francesca Michielin, which was also certified platinum by the Federation of the Italian Music Industry. The album debuted at number one on the Italian Albums Chart, and it was later certified triple platinum denoting sales exceeding 180,000 units. To promote the album, Fedez embarked on a tour starting from 12 April 2013 in Turin.
The album also spawned the single "Alfonso Signorini (eroe nazionale)", whose music video features Italian TV personalities Alfonso Signorini and Raffaella Fico.

In June 2013, Fedez was also a guest judge during the auditions of the seventh season of the Italian talent show X Factor. In May 2013, it was announced that Fedez and Victoria Cabello would replace Elio and Simona Ventura as judges on the eighth season of the Italian version of X Factor alongside Morgan and Mika. His fourth studio album, Pop-Hoolista, was released on 30 September 2014. Predeced by the single "Generazione boh", the record also includes duets with Malika Ayane, Francesca Michielin, Noemi, Elisa and J-Ax. The album debuted atop the Italian Albums Chart, and it was certified gold one week after its release.

In 2021, Fedez was one of the acts competing in the Sanremo Music Festival; dueting with long-time collaborator Francesca Michielin, the pair performed their song "Chiamami per nome" (Call me by my name) and finished second. In the same year, Fedez also hosted the program LOL - Chi ride è fuori together with Mara Maionchi. In June, he released the single "Mille", a collaboration with Achille Lauro and Orietta Berti; the song peaked at number 1 in Italy, giving Fedez his tenth number one song.

On 1 November 2021, he announced his sixth album Disumano (Inhuman), which was released on 26 November, simultaneously with the single "Sapore", in collaboration with Tedua. On 3 June 2022 he published summer hit "La dolce vita", a collaboration with Tananai and Mara Sattei

As of July 2022, Fedez has 63 entries in the Italian Billboard Hot 100 chart.

Personal life
Fedez proposed to Chiara Ferragni, an Italian fashion blogger and entrepreneur, on 6 May 2017 during his concert in Verona. The concert and proposal were broadcast live on the Italian radio and TV channel RTL 102.5. They have a son, Leone (born 19 March 2018), and a daughter, Vittoria (born 23 March 2021). Fedez and Ferragni married in Noto, Sicily on 1 September 2018. On 17 March 2022, Fedez publicly shared via Instagram that he was seriously ill with a newly diagnosed disease, though he did not reveal what the disease was at the time. However, on 24 March 2022, he later revealed, again via Instagram, that he had received surgery at San Raffaele Hospital in Milan on 22 March 2022 for removal of a rare pancreatic neuroendocrine tumour. The surgery, which lasted 6 hours and involved a partial pancreatectomy, was reported to have gone well.

Activism
In 2020, Fedez raised €3 million in 24 hours through a fundraiser with Chiara Ferragni to support the San Raffaele hospital in Milan during the COVID-19 pandemic in Italy.

Fedez is an avid supporter of LGBT rights. In 2021, right after a performance with Francesca Michielin at the First May Concert, the rapper interrupted the concert by reading a speech in defense of Ddl Zan, a proposed act to protect fragile groups from abuse (such as women, the disabled, and the LGBTQ+ community), reading homophobic quotes said by members of the Lega Nord faction, including Matteo Salvini, Giovanni De Paoli,  and Alessandro Rinaldi. Fedez also spoke about freedom of expression, accusing the apex of Rai3, Ilaria Capitani and Franco Di Mare, of having asked him to stop his speech because it was seen as "inappropriate in that context"; Rai3 denied the accusation of attempted censorship and Fedez published a phone call which, he stated, showsed the attempted censorship by the network.

Endorsements
Throughout his career, Fedez has endorsed multiple brands, including Puma, Samsung, Bershka, Intimissimi, Sisley, Swarovski and Yamamay.

Discography

Studio albums

EPs

Mixtapes

Singles

Other charted songs

Featured in

Filmography

Awards and nominations

References

External links
Fedez at Allmusic

Italian rappers
1989 births
Living people
Musicians from Milan
Rappers from Milan
Italian LGBT rights activists